Open SUNY was renamed to SUNY Online in 2021, and is part of the State University of New York.

History of SUNY Online

SLN (prior to 2013) 
SLN, or SUNY Learning Network, was an initiative that made online learning at the 64 SUNY schools accessible. SUNY Learning Network provided course design instruction and support from SUNY COTE, or Center for Online Teaching Excellence, as well as Learning Management System hosting and support with expansive helpdesk and application services.

Open SUNY (2013) 
In 2013, Nancy Zimpher, the 12th Chancellor for the State University of New York, announced the launch of Open SUNY, shifting services and support of SLN under the new Open SUNY name. This announcement expanded online course and degree offerings across the SUNY System. At its launch in 2014, Open SUNY included 10 online bachelor’s degree programs in high-demand fields. Since its launch, Open SUNY degree and course offerings swelled to nearly 500 degree programs and certificates and 20,000 online courses. Open SUNY has three degree designations: Open SUNY and Open SUNY+. According to the Open SUNY, an Open SUNY+ degree is one that offers the following:

 "Personal Concierge
 HelpDesk and Tutoring
 Experiential Learning.
 Industry-Leading Teaching Practices
 High-Need Areas

SUNY Online (2019 to current) 
At her second State of the University address in 2019, SUNY's 13th Chancellor, Dr. Kristina M. Johnson, announced her vision for the university system with the launch of SUNY Online. 

The announcement, according to Johnson, would expand the online offerings and deliver specialized program pathways for non-traditional students who wish to either pursue or finish a degree online. SUNY Online worked with campuses to offer program pathways in high-demand fields. The innovative idea not only laid out a specialized program pathways for adult and graduate students but for the first time SUNY System provided system-level support for students with the SUNY Online Success Coach. The first series of program pathways offered by SUNY Online includes:

 Business and Accounting
 Crime Analysis and Security Studies
 Digital Security
 Engineering
 Healthcare Management
 Psychology 

SUNY Online students work with SUNY Online admissions coaches to apply, but all SUNY Online degrees are delivered and conferred by SUNY campuses. SUNY Online pathways allow students to complete a 4-year degree or pursue grad school in stages. Students can enter with some credits, no credits, or a degree already in hand. While SUNY Online students pursue a SUNY Online degree, their Success Coach stays with them through the transfer process, until graduation, and as they move on to grad school. 

Not only did SUNY Online commit to program pathways for adult learners, but the announcement initiated a merger with Open SUNY.  Open SUNY began the process of merging with SUNY Online in the summer of 2020, prior to the departure of Kristina M. Johnson, who announced she would the president of Ohio State University. 

The merger of services and support was critical during the time of COVID-19 when Governor Andrew Cuomo announced all State University of New York campuses would go remote for the remainder of the spring 2021 semester. 

During the pandemic, SUNY Online offered coaching support, expanded helpdesk services to SUNY campuses, drop-in hours for students and faculty who required technical assistance, and COVID-19 resources on its COVID-19 response page.

References

External links
Open SUNY
SUNY Online - sunyonline.edu
Lewin, Tamar. (2013, May 30). "Universities Team with Online Course Provider," The New York Times.
New York Times. (2005, July 5). "SUNY To Offer Major Online Degree"

State University of New York
Distance education institutions based in the United States